Buck Rogers in the 25th Century is an American science-fiction and adventure series produced by Universal Studios and ran on NBC from September 20, 1979 to April 16, 1981.

Series overview

Episodes

Season 1 (1979–80)

Season 2 (1981)

External links

Buck Rogers
Lists of American science fiction television series episodes